Meiser railway station is a railway station in Brussels, Belgium, which was opened in 1976. It is located on line 26 between the stations of Schaerbeek-Josaphat and of Mérode in the municipality of Schaerbeek. The crossroad Meiser on the greater ring is located a hundred meters away from the station which lies under the Chaussée de Louvain/Leuvensesteenweg. The station can be accessed via the Chaussée de Louvain, the Avenue Rogier/Rogierlaan or the Rue de la Luzerne/Luzernestraat.

Train services
The station is served by the following service(s):

Brussels RER services (S4) Vilvoorde - Merode - Etterbeek - Brussels-Luxembourg - Denderleeuw - Aalst (weekdays, peak hours only)
Brussels RER services (S5) Mechelen - Brussels-Luxembourg - Etterbeek - Halle - Enghien (- Geraardsbergen) (weekdays)
Brussels RER services (S7) Mechelen - Merode - Halle (weekdays)
Brussels RER services (S9) Leuven - Brussels-Luxembourg - Etterbeek - Braine-l'Alleud (weekdays, peak hours only)

Connections
The station offers a correspondence with the tram route 25, which runs between Rogier and the Boondael railway station and tram route 62.

Bus services  318, 351 and 358 serve the station, stopping at the south side of the station.

References

Railway stations in Brussels
Schaerbeek
Railway stations opened in 1976